Jamie Cox (born 15 October 1969) is an Australian cricketer and former opening batsman for Tasmania in Australia's domestic competitions.

He then played county cricket in England where he captained Somerset. He is a former member of the Cricket Australia's National Selection Committee and previously Director of Cricket at the South Australian Cricket Association. He was then General Manager of Football Performance at the St Kilda Football Club in the AFL, before being appointed to the MCC staff as Assistant Secretary.

Career
Cox was born at Burnie in Tasmania on 15 October 1969 and from a young age was breaking batting records. In high school, he broke the all-schools batting record for Australian school cricket, previously held by Bill Lawry. He made his first grade debut for Wynyard as a 15-year-old in 1984. 

As a young player, Cox played Australian Rules Football for local side Wynyard, before being drafted to the Victorian Football League's Essendon Football Club in 1987. However, Cox never played a senior game with the Bombers, instead focusing on cricket.

In first grade cricket, Cox, with partner Dene Hills broke the Tasmanian first grade partnership record in his first season, and was immediately elevated to first-class cricket before his 18th birthday, in 1987.

Cox was expected to go from there to play for Australia and to captain Australia in Test cricket, however in Cox's first 5 seasons, in spite of mostly batting with Hills, Cox finished with a batting average under 30.
In 1992, at the age of 23, Jamie Cox had his first good season, where he averaged over 50, and from then on he averaged over 50 in 8 consecutive seasons, bringing his cumulative batting average up to nearly 50.

In 2001, Jamie Cox was playing county cricket for Somerset in England when the Australian tourists played.

At the end of the 2004 season with Somerset, Jamie Cox was dropped from the county team. Approaching retirement, as Tasmania failed to select him, after playing the occasional game in the next season, he announced his retirement from first-class cricket in March 2006.

Post-playing career
Cox was a cricket media analyst/journalist and Athlete Career and Education Consultant with the Tasmanian Institute of Sport.

After writing his "Postcards" series in various newspapers while playing, he already appeared in both Australian and International print, including Inside Cricket magazine, and on ABC television broadcasts as a commentator.

In November 2006 he was regarded as a surprise choice to replace Allan Border as a selector of the national cricket team. He stepped down from this role in 2011.

Cox was Director of Cricket at the South Australian Cricket Association from mid-2008 until his sacking in 2014.

He was General Manager of Football Performance at AFL club St Kilda from 2014, until joining the MCC staff in 2021.

References

External links

1969 births
Living people

People from Burnie, Tasmania
Tasmania cricketers
Australian cricketers
Cricketers from Tasmania
Somerset cricket captains
Australian cricket commentators
Australian radio personalities
Australian television personalities
Wynyard Football Club players
Australian rules footballers from Tasmania
Australia national cricket team selectors
Marylebone Cricket Club cricketers